The Rally del Atlántico - Trofeo Ricardo Gorbarán is an international rallying race held in the Lavalleja and Maldonado departments in Uruguay since 1994. The event has been hosted in Punta del Este, Minas, San Carlos, Piriápolis and El Edén along the different editions, always on gravel roads. The event is a round of the Codasur South American Rally Championship and the Uruguayan Rally Championship since the first edition. Some years it has also been a round of the Argentinian Rally Championship.

Paraguayan drivers Alejandro Galanti and Gustavo Saba are the most successful drivers in the rally's history having each won five times.

List of winners
Sourced in part from:

References

External links
Official website
CODASUR official website

Atlantico
Auto races in Uruguay
Lavalleja Department
Sport in Maldonado Department